Kasım Gülek (1905 – 1996) was a prominent Turkish statesman credited with being instrumental in entrenching democracy in Turkey by taking politics to the masses.

==Biography==
He was born and lived in Adana, Adana Vilayet, Ottoman Empire, until he went away to school in Istanbul, where he studied respectively at Galatasaray High School and Robert College. He then went on to study at Ecole des Sciences Politiques in Paris, France, followed by Columbia University in New York City, New York, United States, where he received his PhD in Economics. 
After undertaking post doctorate studies at Cambridge in the United Kingdom and Berlin University as a fellow of the Rockefeller Foundation, he returned to his country upon request form the founder and president of the republic of Turkey, Mustafa Kemal Atatürk.

Political career
After receiving a letter praising Kasım Gülek from the Dean of Columbia University, Atatürk, founder of modern Turkey, called upon him and offered him to become a Member of Parliament. Throughout his career, he held various ministerial positions including Minister of Public Works, Minister of Communications, Transport Minister, and Deputy Prime Minister.

He was a leading member of Atatürk's party, the Republican People's Party (CHP). Early in 1947 he was one of the leaders of group of thirty-five deputies who revolted in the party caucus urging reforms and liberalizations. The episode was called the "Rebellion of 35", but even though it was unsuccessful, Gülek and three other insurgents were still permitted to join the cabinet afterwards.

He is best remembered for his role as the Secretary General of the Republican People's Party from 1950 until 1959, a position to which he was elected seven consecutive times with an overwhelming majority of the vote. During his time as Secretary General, he resurrected the crushed CHP by travelling to the all corners of Turkey visiting almost every village in the country. He later served as a member of the Constituent Assembly and as a Senator from Adana.

He also held several international positions such as Chairman of the UN Commission on Korea, President of the North Atlantic Assembly, Governor of the Atlantic Institute, Vice-President of NATO Parliamentarians Conference and Vice-President of the Parliamentary Assembly of the Council of Europe.

He had 2 children, including Tayyibe Gülek.

References
 Afad.org.tr - Biography of Kasım Gülek

External links 
 

1905 births
1996 deaths
People from Adana
People from Adana vilayet
Republican People's Party (Turkey) politicians
Ministers of Transport and Communications of Turkey
Ministers of Public Works of Turkey
Government ministers of Turkey
Deputies of Adana
Galatasaray High School alumni
Robert College alumni
Columbia Graduate School of Arts and Sciences alumni
Members of the 16th government of Turkey
Members of the 17th government of Turkey